Russell Duncan (born 15 September 1980, in Aberdeen) is a Scottish professional footballer.

Duncan joined Inverness CT from Aberdeen in 2001, and made nearly 300 league appearances in 10 seasons with the club. During May 2011, Duncan and Grant Munro were told that they would not have their contracts renewed. His final game at the Caledonian Stadium was against St Mirren, but Duncan was sent off for a tangle with St Mirren defender Lee Mair. He played his last game for Inverness as a second-half substitute for Grant Munro in a 2–1 win at New Douglas Park.

Duncan then signed for Ross County, but was released by in December 2012.

References

External links

Living people
1980 births
Footballers from Aberdeen
Scottish footballers
Scottish Premier League players
Scottish Football League players
Aberdeen F.C. players
Elgin City F.C. players
Forfar Athletic F.C. players
Inverness Caledonian Thistle F.C. players
Ross County F.C. players
Peterhead F.C. players
Brora Rangers F.C. players
Association football midfielders